Thermalbad Wiesenbad is a municipality in the district of Erzgebirgskreis, in Saxony, Germany.

History 
From 1952 to 1990, Thermalbad Wiesenbad was part of the Bezirk Karl-Marx-Stadt of East Germany.

Historical Population
On 3 October 1990 the population of the present-day municipality Thermalbad Wiesenbad was 4169. The following figures show the population on 31 December of the corresponding year. 

 Source: Statistical Office of the Free State of Saxony

References 

Erzgebirgskreis
Spa towns in Germany